"Tattoo" is a single by musician Mike Oldfield, released in 1992. It is from the album Tubular Bells II. There were two singles released for "Tattoo", one being called the Live at Edinburgh Castle EP.

One of the B-sides is Oldfield's instrumental rendition of the Christmas carol "Silent Night".

Charts
It charted at number 33 in the UK Singles Chart.

Track listing

CD single
 "Tattoo" (edit) – 3:41
 "Sentinel" (live) – 8:06
 "Silent Night" – 4:19

Live at Edinburgh Castle EP
 "Tattoo" – 3:44
 "Maya Gold" – 4:10
 "Moonshine" – 1:42
 "Reprise" – 1:20

References

1992 singles
Mike Oldfield songs
Songs written by Mike Oldfield
Warner Music Group singles
1992 songs
Song recordings produced by Trevor Horn